Turning is a machining process in which a cutting tool describes a helical toolpath by moving within a plane while the workpiece rotates.

Turning or The Turning may also refer to:

Film
Turning (2002 film), a Russian drama film
Turning (2012 film), documentary art film by Charles Atlas
The Turning (1992 film), an American film
The Turning (2013 film), an Australian film based on Tim Winton short stories
The Turning (2020 film), a film adaptation of The Turn of the Screw by Henry James

Music
Turning (album), soundtrack album for Charles Atlas film, by Antony and the Johnsons
Turning (Suzanne Ciani album), an album by Suzanne Ciani
The Turning (album), a 1987 album by Sam Phillips
"The Turning", a song by Oasis from the album Dig Out Your Soul

Other media
The Turning (stories), a collection of short stories by Tim Winton 
The Turning (play), by Bill McCluskey

See also
Turning Point (disambiguation)